Dorian Haarhoff (born 1944) is a South African-Namibian writer and poet. Haarhoff was born in 1944 in Kimberley, Northern Cape, then part of the Cape Province. He is a naturalized citizen of Namibia. He wrote his first poem in 1955 and has been published in numerous books. He was also a professor of English at the University of Namibia. As of 2004, he worked in the creative writing department at the University of Cape Town.

References

1944 births
Living people
White Namibian people
People from Kimberley, Northern Cape
Namibian writers
Namibian poets
South African emigrants to Namibia
Naturalised citizens of Namibia
Academic staff of the University of Namibia
Academic staff of the University of Cape Town
20th-century Namibian writers
21st-century Namibian writers